= Tegur =

Coordinates: 15°33′N 74°50′E

- Village
- Interactive map of Tegur
- Country: India
- State: Karnataka
- District: Dharwad

Languages
  - Official: Kannada
- Time zone: UTC+5:30 (IST)

Tegur is a village in Dharwad district of Karnataka, India.
